Dek is a purported but unattested alleged language of northern Cameroon. There is no data on whether it exists. Both Glottolog and Ethnologue list it as a Niger-Congo language.

References

Languages of Cameroon
Unattested languages of Africa